Senator Blake may refer to:

Edward Reed Blake (1844–1923), Wisconsin State Senate
Harris Blake (1929–2014), North Carolina State Senate
Harrison G. O. Blake (1818–1876), Ohio State Senate
John Blake (Pennsylvania politician) (born 1960), Pennsylvania State Senate
Samuel Blake (1807–1887), Maine State Senate